New Providence is an unincorporated community and Village in Providence Township in Lancaster County, Pennsylvania, United States. New Providence is located at the intersection of Main Street and Pennsy Road southwest of the Big Beaver Creek and U.S. Route 222 and northwest of Quarryville.

References

Unincorporated communities in Lancaster County, Pennsylvania
Unincorporated communities in Pennsylvania